The Lawrenceville Historic District is a U.S. historic district in Pittsburgh, Pennsylvania, which encompasses the majority of the Lawrenceville neighborhood. The historic district includes 3,217 contributing resources, many of which are rowhouses, commercial buildings, and former industrial properties built between the 1830s and early 20th century. The district was listed on the National Register of Historic Places in 2019.

Notable contributing properties

Allegheny Arsenal
Allegheny Cemetery†
Arsenal Middle School†
Bayard School†
Boys' Club of Pittsburgh†
Butler Street Gatehouse†
Carnegie Library
Carol Peterson House
Consolidated Ice Company Factory No. 2†
Doughboy
Ewalt House
Foster School†
Holy Family Church
Iron City Brewing Company
Lawrence Public School†
McCleary Elementary School†
Mowry-Addison Mansion
Naser's Tavern
Pennsylvania National Bank Building
Pittsburgh Wash House and Public Baths Building
St. Augustine Church
St. John the Baptist Church
St. Mary Cemetery
St. Mary's Academy
St. Mary's Church
Turney House
U.S. Marine Hospital, Pittsburgh
Walton House
Washington Crossing Bridge
Washington Vocational School†

†Also individually NRHP-listed

References

Lawrenceville (Pittsburgh)
National Register of Historic Places in Pittsburgh
Historic districts on the National Register of Historic Places in Pennsylvania